This is a list of Spanish language newspapers published in the United States.

Current

United States

U.S. Territories

Defunct

United States

U.S. Territories

See also
 List of Spanish-language television networks in the United States

Notes

References

Bibliography

 
 
 
  (List of titles)

External links
University of South Florida Libraries: Tampa/Cuba Latino Periodicals
  (Publicly accessible digital library of "historic Mexican and Mexican American publications published in Tucson, El Paso, Los Angeles, San Francisco, and Sonora, Mexico from the mid-1800s to the 1970s")
 
 
 Digital Public Library of America. Miscellaneous items related to Spanish-language newspapers
  (English translations of selected Spanish-language newspaper articles, 1855–1938).
 
 
 

Spanish